Anne Beauchamp, 15th Countess of Warwick (14 February 1444 – 3 June 1449), was the only child and heiress of the English nobleman Henry Beauchamp, 1st Duke of Warwick. She died a child aged 5, after which the earldom of Warwick was inherited by her paternal aunt. The title then passed by marriage to Anne's maternal uncle, Richard Neville, the famous 'Kingmaker' of the later Wars of the Roses.

Life
Anne Beauchamp was born on 14 February 1444 at Cardiff in Wales. Her father was Henry Beauchamp, Duke of Warwick (1425–1446), the last male of the medieval Beauchamp family to hold the Warwick title. Anne's mother was Cecily Neville, sister to Richard Neville, who later played a key role in the Wars of the Roses.

On 11 June 1446, Anne's father died. The dukedom of Warwick, created in 1445, had been originally granted to heirs male only, and so became extinct upon Henry Beauchamp's death, but the earldom (created in 1088) allowed for female succession and was therefore inherited by his daughter. She also inherited from her father the barony of Burghersh, being the 7th person to hold that title since its creation in 1330. Upon the death of King Henry VI's uncle Humphrey, Duke of Gloucester, on 23 February 1447, Anne also succeeded to the lordship of the Channel Islands, which had been previously entailed on her father.

The infant Anne was one of the greatest heiresses of her day, alongside the infant Lady Margaret Beaufort, the daughter of the 1st Duke of Somerset who had died in 1444. Both girls became wards of Anne's maternal step-great-grandmother, Alice Chaucer (widow of Thomas Montagu, 4th Earl of Salisbury, and a lady-in-waiting to Queen Margaret of Anjou) and William de la Pole, shortly to be Duke of Suffolk, who intended Anne to marry his own heir, John de la Pole (1442–1492).

Anne died on 3 June 1449, aged five, at Ewelme (the Chaucer home) in Oxfordshire. She was buried in Reading Abbey church. Reading may have been chosen as her burial site because her great grandmother, Constance of York, had been buried there.

Anne's title Countess of Warwick was inherited by her paternal aunt, Lady Anne. The barony of Burghersh fell into abeyance between her aunts.

After Anne's death, the Duke of Suffolk instead arranged a 'solemn betrothal' between his son and Lady Margaret, a marriage contract that by law could be, and on the initiative of the king was, dissolved while the bride was below the age of twelve; Margaret herself never subsequently recognized John as her first husband. John went on to marry Elizabeth of York, sister to the later kings Edward IV and Richard III. Margaret married Edmund Tudor, 1st Earl of Richmond, and became the mother of King Henry VII.

Ancestry

Footnotes

References
 
 
 
 
 

1444 births
1449 deaths
15th-century English nobility
15th-century English women
Anne
Burials at Reading Abbey
Beauchamp
English countesses
Daughters of English dukes
Hereditary women peers
People from Cardiff
People from South Oxfordshire District
Barons Burghersh
Royalty and nobility who died as children